John Francis Robert "Jake" Pelkington Jr. (January 3, 1916 – May 1, 1982) was an American professional basketball player in the American Basketball League (ABL), National Basketball League (NBL), and Basketball Association of America (BAA). Pelkington enjoyed success in his career, winning three league championships (one in the ABL, two in the NBL) and was a three-time second-team all-NBL selection. He is 10th all-time in NBL career scoring with 1,949 points.

BAA career statistics

Regular season

Playoffs

References

1916 births
1982 deaths
Akron Goodyear Wingfoots players
American Basketball League (1925–1955) players
American men's basketball players
Baltimore Bullets (1944–1954) players
Basketball players from New York City
Centers (basketball)
Fort Wayne Zollner Pistons players
Fort Wayne Pistons players
Forwards (basketball)
Manhattan Jaspers basketball players
Sportspeople from Queens, New York